Od, also known as Oad or Odki, is an Indo-Aryan language of India and Pakistan. It is spoken by around 2 million people in Gujarat, Rajasthan, Haryana, New Delhi, Punjab and Sindh. It has similarities to Marathi, with features also shared with Gujarati and borrowings from Marwari and Punjabi.

Groups attempting the preservation of the language in Pakistan include Oadki Rakarhanga and OLCDO.

References

External links 
 Oadki Language and Community Development Organization

Indo-Aryan languages
Languages of Sindh
Languages of Punjab, Pakistan